Elizabeth Russell, Duchess of Bedford VA (née Sackville-West; 23 September 1818 – 22 April 1897) was born the daughter of the 5th Earl De La Warr and his wife Lady Elizabeth Sackville.

Early life
She was baptised as Elizabeth West on 18 October 1818 at Bourn, Cambridgeshire, the abode was given as the family home at Bourn Hall.

Marriage and issue
Lady Elizabeth Sackville-West was a bridesmaid at the wedding of Queen Victoria and Prince Albert on 10 February 1840.

In Buckhurst Park on 18 January 1844 she was married to Francis Russell, a grandson of the late 6th Duke of Bedford and nephew of Lord John Russell, the Whig politician and future Prime Minister. Francis Russell succeeded his cousin as 9th Duke of Bedford in 1872.

Elizabeth was appointed Mistress of the Robes to the Queen by Mr Gladstone in 1880, and served in that capacity until 1883. In 1886, Gladstone's policy of Home Rule had alienated many of the aristocrats in the Liberal Party, and no lady of suitable (i.e., ducal) rank could be found who was willing to serve as Mistress of the Robes. The Duchess of Bedford performed the duties of the office for the duration of the ministry, but was not appointed to the post by Gladstone.

She was widowed in 1891 after the Duke committed suicide. She died, aged 78, at Latimer House, near Chesham, Buckinghamshire, in 1897 and, after cremation at Woking Crematorium, her ashes were buried in the 'Bedford Chapel' at St. Michael's Church, Chenies, Buckinghamshire.

References

 "Burke's Peerage and Baronetage"

Works cited
 

1818 births
1897 deaths
19th-century English nobility
19th-century English women
English duchesses by marriage
Ladies of the Royal Order of Victoria and Albert
Daughters of British earls
Daughters of barons
Elizabeth Russell, Duchess of Bedford
Mistresses of the Robes to Queen Victoria
Duchesses of Bedford
Wives of knights